"Stop!" is a song by English singer-songwriter Sam Brown from her debut studio album of the same name (1988). It was written by Brown, Gregg Sutton and Bruce Brody.

"Stop!" reached number 52 on the UK Singles Chart when it was first released. Following its re-release in 1989, the song peaked at number four, becoming Brown's highest-charting single to date, and spending 12 weeks on the chart. Additionally, "Stop" topped the charts in Belgium, Iceland, the Netherlands and Norway, while reaching the top five in Australia, Austria, Finland, France, Ireland and Switzerland. The song was featured in the soundtrack to the 1992 film Bitter Moon.

Critical reception
Pan-European magazine Music & Media picked "Stop!" as Single of the Week, complimenting "an impressive new talent whose striking debut single leaves us with no doubts about her future." They added that "her commanding vocals fare well in this emotional and powerful ballad, suitable for all types of radio formats." Upon the 1989 re-release, Betty Page from Record Mirror wrote, "Second time lucky, please, for Sam's powerful R&B-ish ballad (out first time last year) from her cruelly overlooked debut LP. It's a barnstormer of a vocal performance — gutsy but strangely vulnerable at the same time. What a woman. She's made it big in Europe already, so it's about time you lot out there woke up to her considerable talents." David Cavanagh of Sounds described the song as "absolutely corking" and "solid gold". He added, "Sam's obviously a sucker for Dusty Springfield and is equipped with a startlingly good voice."

Track listings
UK CD single
"Stop!" (edit)
"Blue Soldier"

UK 7-inch single
A. "Stop!" (edit)
B. "Blue Soldier"

UK 12-inch single
A1. "Stop!" (album version)
A2. "Poor Frank"
B1. "Blue Soldier"
B2. "Bones"

Credits and personnel
Credits adapted from the liner notes of Stop!
Sam Brown – lead vocals; string arrangements
Jakko Jakszyk – guitar
Gavin Harrison – drums
Ed Poole – bass guitar
Kevin Malpass – Hammond organ; string arrangements
Bob Andrews – Hammond organ solo
Andy Price – 1st violin
Mark Walton – 2nd violin
Kate Musker – viola
Peter Esswood – cello
Vicki Brown – backing vocals
Margo Buchanan – backing vocals

Charts

Weekly charts

Year-end charts

Certifications

Release history

Jamelia version

English singer Jamelia covered "Stop!" after the makers of the 2004 film Bridget Jones: The Edge of Reason approached her to record it to illustrate an integral part of the film. Jamelia instantly accepted the offer and explained how much she was a fan of the character and of the first film. The exclamation mark at the end of the title was dropped for the Jamelia release.

"Stop" was released as a double A-side with the song "DJ" on 1 November 2004. The single peaked at number nine on the UK Singles Chart and became Jamelia's fourth consecutive top-10 entry, spending 12 weeks on the chart. It also became her fourth consecutive top-40 single in Australia, peaking at number 37.

The formats of "DJ" and "Stop" received a staggered release. On 1 November 2004, the two-track CD one was released along with the "DJ" CD release. Due to time constraints, the "Stop" music video (directed by Alex Hemming) could not be added in time to make the 1 November release date and so the CD two was released a week later on 8 November 2004. This was also the first DVD single release from Jamelia. The single release also contained a cover of Wham!'s "Last Christmas".

Track listings
 UK CD1 and European CD single
 "DJ"
 "Stop"

 UK CD2
 "DJ"
 "Stop"
 "Last Christmas"
 "Stop" (video)

 Australian CD single
 "DJ"
 "Stop"
 "Last Christmas"

Charts
All entries charted as "DJ" / "Stop" unless otherwise noted.

Weekly charts

Year-end charts

Other versions
It was covered by Polish singer Edyta Górniak in 1989, at age 16, when she gave her first public appearance on a Polish television talent show of which she won.
It was covered by blues rocker Joe Bonamassa in 2009, who recorded a seven-minute version of the song for inclusion on his album The Ballad of John Henry.
It was covered by Norwegian singer Ane Brun in 2005, whom released a version (as a duet with Liv Widell) on her album Duets.
It was covered by Icelandic singer Hafdís Huld, whom recorded an a cappella version which was used for a pan-European TV commercial for Mercedes-Benz in the summer of 2008. A fully instrumented version was released as a single in Iceland on 24 October 2008 with a full iTunes release on 24 November via Red Grape.
It was covered by Vietnamese singer Mỹ Tâm on her album 10 Years Anniversary Liveshow 2011: Mỹ Tâm Melodies of time
It was covered by Paul Dempsey, frontman of the Australian group Something for Kate, as a bonus track on the deluxe version of the band's 2012 album Leave Your Soul to Science.
It was covered by Italian singer Andrea Faustini in week 7 of the live show on The X Factor 2014 after ending up in the bottom two with Stevi Ritchie.
It was covered by Four of Diamonds in the six chair challenge on The X Factor 2016.
It was covered by Nikita Dzhigurda in the voice of Whitney Houston on "Pikabu" 2019 specially for Makhmud.

References

1980s ballads
1988 songs
1988 singles
2004 singles
A&M Records singles
Blue-eyed soul songs
Contemporary R&B ballads
Dutch Top 40 number-one singles
Jamelia songs
Number-one singles in Iceland
Number-one singles in Norway
Parlophone singles
Sam Brown (singer) songs
Songs written by Gregg Sutton
Soul ballads
Ultratop 50 Singles (Flanders) number-one singles
Songs written by Sam Brown (singer)